Meiho University (MU) is an accredited, private university in Neipu Township, Pingtung County, Taiwan. It has nearly 8,000 students. MU is known for its nursing program.

Meiho University offers undergraduate and graduate programs across a wide range of disciplines, including business, engineering, computer science, design, humanities, and social sciences. The university has six colleges: the College of Engineering, the College of Business and Management, the College of Humanities and Social Sciences, the College of Design, the College of Health and Medical Sciences, and the College of Tourism.

History
The university began in 1966 as Taiwan's first private nursing college named Meiho Junior College of Nursing. In 1990, the school was renamed to Meiho Junior College of Nursing and Management and again renamed to Meiho Institute of Technology in 1999. In 2010, the school was  renamed Meiho University.

Academics
MU houses 18 departments and three graduate institutes organized in three colleges. 
 College of Health and Nursing
 College of Business and Management
 College of Human Ecology
MU offers graduate programs in Healthcare Management, Biotechnology, and Business Administration.

See also
 List of universities in Taiwan

References

External links

 
 

1966 establishments in Taiwan
Educational institutions established in 1966
Private universities and colleges in Taiwan
Universities and colleges in Pingtung County
Universities and colleges in Taiwan
Technical universities and colleges in Taiwan